Nautilus Productions LLC is an American video production, stock footage, and photography company incorporated in Fayetteville, North Carolina in 1997. The principals are producer/director Rick Allen and photographer Cindy Burnham. Nautilus specializes in documentary production and underwater videography, and produced QAR DiveLive, a live webcast of underwater archaeology filmed at the wreck of the Queen Anne's Revenge in 2000 and 2001.

History and output

Nautilus has produced several documentaries, including The Kill Zone for the National Geographic International Channel; Assault on America: The Battle for Torpedo Junction for the Canadian History Channel; and the Mystery Mardi Gras Shipwreck for Texas A&M University; BOEM; and the Louisiana State Museum. Above the water Nautilus spent seven years covering NASCAR for Office Depot and also worked with Bob Ballard, discoverer of the Titanic, on a piece for CBS 60 Minutes.

Nautilus Productions is also the owner and licensor of stock footage from the Queen Anne's Revenge Shipwreck Project. Many documentaries created about the pirate Blackbeard and the Queen Anne's Revenge Shipwreck Project have incorporated project videographer Rick Allen's stock footage or video in their content.

In 2000, Nautilus Productions co-produced with Bill Lovin of Marine Grafics, a week-long live internet broadcast known as QAR DiveLive from the Blackbeard wreck site and the Queen Anne's Revenge conservation lab. At the time, this was the first live video and audio broadcast from an underwater archaeological site to the World Wide Web. Students were able to watch the underwater archaeology in real time, virtually visit the lab and ask questions of the scientists exploring the shipwreck. The twice-daily live distance learning programs reached students from as far away as Canada during the five days of broadcasting. In October 2001 Allen and Lovin again co-produced the QAR DiveLive 2001 webcasts with similar success.

Other projects include videography on the USS Monitor and HMCS Canada (Queen of Nassau) with the National Oceanic and Atmospheric Administration (NOAA), the recovery of a World War II era B-25C Mitchell bomber from Lake Murray, SC for the Mega Movers series on the History Channel, and the SS Commodore, made famous in author Stephen Crane's short story "The Open Boat".

Works
Lights, Camera ... Shipwreck!?! Multimedia at Four Thousand Feet. Kimberly L. Faulk and Rick Allen, Historical Archaeology, Vol. 51, Issue 3, The Mardi Gras Shipwreck: The Archaeology of an Early Nineteenth-Century Wooden-Hulled Sailing Ship, September 2017, pp. 418–424.

References

External links
 
 Blackbeard's Queen Anne's Revenge Shipwreck Project Video
 Mystery Mardi Gras Shipwreck Short
 Bob Ballard: The Great Explorer
 SS Commodore Wreck Site
 Lake Murray's Mitchell
 Podcast: Southern Museum of Flight
Podcast: Blackbeard's Shipwreck And The Hook
Photographer suing state over Blackbeard shipwreck footage WRAL-TV

Companies based in North Carolina
Television production companies of the United States
Underwater archaeology
Stock photography
Photography companies of the United States
Mass media companies established in 1997
Underwater diving companies